The River Murray Football League is an Australian rules football competition based in the Murray Bridge region of South Australia, Australia.  It is an affiliated member of the South Australian National Football League.

History 
The competition was founded in 1931 with the foundation clubs Imperials, Ramblers and Mypolonga.

Traditionally the 2 Murray Bridge clubs, Imperials and Ramblers, have had a fierce rivalry, and both have had their fair share of success over the years.  Tailem Bend and Jervois, who are both based in smaller townships, are proud clubs with fine traditions and premiership success to go with it.  Mannum and Mypolonga both broke premiership droughts in recent decades, however both clubs have struggled in the last 15 years to convert multiple grand final appearances into premierships. Meningie broke through for their first premiership in the RMFL in 2001, however their form since has fluctuated dependent on their ability to recruit players from the Adelaide region.

In 2007 the Jervois Football Club won their fourth consecutive League Premiership when they defeated the Imperial Football Club for the second consecutive year.  2004 to 2007 was a golden era for the Jervois Football Club, but they were unable to win 5 in a row in 2008, with the Rambler Football Club winning their first premiership since 1987 after defeating Mypolonga.

Ramblers won their 2nd premiership in 3 years in 2010 with victory over Mannum.

In the clash of the Murray Bridge clubs in 2011, Imperials defeated reigning premiers Ramblers in the Grand Final at Meningie Oval.  Mail Medalist Tyson Wait led the Blues to victory with a dominant performance in defence.

Very little separated the top 5 clubs in season 2012.  In the Grand Final at Johnston Park, the fast finishing Ramblers side defied the odds to claim a 5-point victory in a high-scoring game against Minor premiers Mypolonga.

The Mannum Football Club broke the recent stranglehold of the 2 Murray Bridge clubs, in 2013, with victory over Imperials in the Grand Final.  With retired SANFL stars Jeremy Clayton and Jade Sheedy featuring prominently, the Roos stormed home in the last quarter to collect their first flag since 2003.

A merger was announced between Miningie and Border Downs-Tintinara at the end of the 2022 season.

Current clubs

Former clubs 
 Border Downs Football Club (1955-1991) Merged with Tintinara (Tatiara FL ) in 1992
 Murray Bridge Redlegs Football Club (1983-2005)
 Border Downs-Tintinara Football Club (1992-2001) Transfer to the Mallee Football League before merging with Meningie in 2022
 Nairne Bremer Football Club (1992-1997)
 Monteith Football Club (1946-1951)
 Meningie Football Club (1955-2022)  Merged with Border Downs-Tintinara in 2022.
 Callington
 Palmer
 Bremer
 Murray Bridge

Inter-League 
From 1958 to 1969 and from 1972 to 1999, the River Murray FL participated in the Lovelock Shield against the Great Southern Football League, Southern Football League and Hills Football League.

League Premiers 
 2022  Imperials 14.18 (77) d Jervois 7.7 (49)
 2021  Jervois 14.5 (89) d Imperials 5.8 (38)
 2020  Jervois 11.14 (80) d Imperials 9.8 (62)
 2019  Mypolonga 12.7 (79) d Ramblers 7.11 (53)
 2018  Imperials 9.6 (60) defeated Mannum 8.10 (58)
 2017  Mypolonga 13.7 (85) defeated Meningie 3.9 (27)
 2016  Ramblers 20.7(127) defeated  Mannum 11.12 (78)
 2015  Mannum 19-5 (119) defeated Imperials 11-5 (71)
 2014  Meningie 15-17 (107) defeated Ramblers 7-7 (49)
 2013  Mannum 13.15 (93) defeated Imperials 10.9 (69)
 2012  Ramblers 21.15 (141) defeated Mypolonga 21.10 (136)
 2011  Imperials 16.15 (111) defeated Ramblers 9.9 (63)
 2010  Ramblers 13.10 (88) defeated Mannum 9.16 (70)
 2009  Imperials 22.15 (147) defeated Mannum 12.8 (80)
 2008  Ramblers 15.15 (105) defeated Mypolonga 10.9 (69)
 2007  Jervois 11.8 (74) defeated Imperials 10.10 (70)
 2006  Jervois 19.10 (124) defeated Imperials 16.10 (106)
 2005  Jervois 26.17 (173) defeated Tailem Bend 5.8 (38)
 2004  Jervois 10.12 (72) defeated Imperials 8.7 (55)
 2003  Mannum 8.8 (56) defeated Imperials 5.9 (39)
 2002  Imperials 15.6 (96) defeated Meningie 12.10 (82)
 2001  Meningie 14.12 (96) defeated Imperials 9.3 (57)
 2000  Tailem Bend 15.101 (100) defeated Imperials 9.3 (57)
 1999  Imperials 18.10 (118) defeated Mannum 10.6 (66)
 1998  Imperials 12.12 (84) defeated Mannum 4.15 (39)
 1997  Tailem Bend 14.9 (93) defeated Imperials 11.16 (82)
 1996  Tailem Bend 15.13 (103) defeated Mannum 4.11 (35)
 1995  Tailem Bend 19.19 (133) defeated Murray Bridge Redlegs 14.10 (94)
 1994  Mypolonga 18.9 (117) defeated Imperials 14.9 (93)
 1993  Imperials 16.10 (106) defeated Mannum 11.10 (76)
 1992  Tailem Bend 20.9 (129) defeated Mannum 12.3 (75)
 1991  Mypolonga 17.15 (117) defeated Tailem Bend 8.9 (57)
 1990  Mypolonga 9.11 (65) defeated Mannum 7.16 (58)
 1989  Mypolonga 16.8 (104) defeated Meningie 12.10 (82)
 1988  Imperials 8.9 (57) defeated Mypolonga 7.10 (52)
 1987  Ramblers 10.18 (78) defeated Imperials 7.17 (57)
 1986  Jervois 8.15 (63) defeated Imperials 7.12 (54)
 1985  Ramblers 17.17 (119) defeated Jervois 16.5 (101)
 1984  Jervois 14.11 (95) defeated Imperials  9.11  (65)
 1983  Imperials 11.11 (77) defeated Ramblers 11.10 (76)
 1982  Ramblers 11.11 (77) defeated Imperials 10-1  (61)
 1981  Ramblers 12.20 (92) defeated Jervois 7.8 (50)
 1980  Ramblers 15-25 (115) defeated Imperials  13-9  (87)
 1979  Ramblers 16-14 (96) defeated Imperials  13-11 (89)
 1978  Imperials 11.11 (77) defeated Ramblers 10.12 (72)
 1977  Imperials 15.11 (101) defeated Ramblers 9.17 (71)
 1976  Imperials 11.11 (77) defeated Ramblers 10.12 (72)
 1975  Ramblers 12-14 (86)defeated Imperials  6-12  (48)
 1974  Tailem Bend 14-20 (104) defeated Ramblers  15-8 (98)
 1973  Tailem Bend 14-18 (102) defeated Jervois 8-6 (54)
 1972  Tailem Bend  17-7 (109)  defeated  Mypolonga 12-10 (82)
 1971  Ramblers 16-13 (109) defeated Tailem Bend  11-21  (87)
 1970  Tailem Bend  13-8  (86) defeated  Meningie  10-18 (78)
 1969  Imperials 10.14 (74) defeated Ramblers 10.12 (72)
 1968  Jervois 18-8 (116) defeated Imperials 15-14 (104)
 1967  Imperials 14.10 (94) defeated Jervois 11.7 (73)
 1966  Jervois 15.10  (100)  defeated Tailem Bend  13.12  (90)
 1965  Tailem Bend 17-15 (117) defeated Ramblers  13-5 (83)
 1964  Jervois  8.11 (59)   d   Ramblers   9.3   (57)
 1963  Jervois 11.15 (81) d Tailem Bend 5-13 (43)
 1962  Tailem Bend  12.5  (77)  d   Jervois 8.6  (54)
 1961  Jervois 9-20 (74) defeated Tailem Bend 9-6 (60)
 1960  Tailem Bend 11-18 (84) defeated Ramblers 8-12 (60)
 1959  Jervois 17.13  (115)   d    Imperials   10.6  (66)
 1958  Imperials 8.11 (59) defeated Tailem Bend 8.10 (58)
 1957  Imperials 9.20 (74) defeated Tailem Bend 10.7 (67)
 1956  Mannum 10-13 (73) defeated Imperials 7-14 (56)
 1955  Mannum 11-11 (77) defeated Tailem Bend 9-14 (68)
 1954  Tailem Bend  11-5  (71)  defeated Ramblers 6-7 (43)
 1953  Imperials 14.10 (94) defeated Mannum 6.8 (44)
 1952  Imperials 9.14 (68) defeated Mannum 6.7 (43)
 1951  Ramblers 9-11 (65)  defeated Imperials 8-5 (53)
 1950  Ramblers 8-5  (53)  defeated Mannum  5-15 (45)
 1949  Mannum 11-10 (76) defeated Imperials 10-11 (71)
 1948  Imperials 15-8  (98) defeated Tailem Bend 11-8 (74)
 1947  Tailem Bend 11-17 (83) defeated Imperials 9-11 (65)
 1946  Imperials 7.4 (46) defeated Jervois 4.6 (30)
 1941-1945 No Competition
 1940  Season abandoned after 8 matches
 1939  Mypolonga 10-8 (68) defeated Ramblers 8-6 (54)
 1938  Mypolonga 12-13 (85)defeated Ramblers  12-8  (80)
 1937  Jervois 9-15 (69)defeated Imperials 8-6 (54)
 1936  Jervois  11.14 (80) defeated Ramblers 7.7 (49)
 1935  Jervois 4.13 (37) defeated Mypolonga  4.7  (31)
 1934  Jervois 15-17 (107) defeated Ramblers 7.7 (49)
 1933  Jervois 14-15(99)defeated Ramblers 9-7(61). Ramblers protested awarded the win
 1932  Jervois 13.9 (87) defeated Imperials  5.12 (42)
 1931  Imperials 4.14 (38) defeated Ramblers 4.6 (30)

Standard Medalists 
The Mail Medal was awarded to the best and fairest player of the year. Awarded from 1938-1940, and then 1949-2012. In 2013 the RMFL changed the name to the Murray Valley Standard Medal.
 2022  Harley Montgomery (Imperials)
 2021  Blake Tabe (Mannum)
 2020  Will McMurray (Tailem Bend)/ Adam Smyth (Mannum)
 2019  Matt Rankine (Ramblers)
 2018  Clint Diment (Mypolonga) Taite Silverlock (Jervois)
 2017  Brodie Martin (Meningie)
 2016  Brian Fenton  (Meningie)
 2015  Jacob Bowen (Mannum)    
 2014  Brian Fenton (Meningie) 
 2013  Tyson Wait (Imperials)
 2012  Phil Smith (Imperials) 
 2011  Tyson Wait (Imperials)
 2010  Adam Eckermann (Mypolonga)
 2009  Tyson Wait (Imperials)
 2008  Liam O'Neil (Ramblers) 
 2007  Ryan Morris (Ramblers)
 2006  Zac Ewer (Jervois)
 2005  Mervyn Kartinyeri (Tailem Bend)
 2004  Mervyn Kartinyeri (Tailem Bend) / Duane Dumesney (Tailem Bend) 
 2003  Daniel Zadow (Mannum)
 2002  Ben Quinn (Mannum)
 2001  Mark Marchetti (Mannum)
 2000  Kym White (Meningie)
 1999  Brett Lienert (Imperials)
 1998  Michael Smart (Ramblers)
 1997  Mervyn Kartinyeri (Tailem Bend)
 1996  Craig Gilbert (Border Downs Tintinara)
 1995  Brett Lienert (Imperials)
 1994  Dwayne Krollig (Mannum) 
 1993  Greg Stephenson (Border Downs Tintinara) 
 1992  Roger Wilson (Tailem Bend)
 1991  Mike Hunt (Tailem Bend) / David Buckley (Mannum)
 1990  Lee Adams (Mannum)
 1989  Noel Hartman (Tailem Bend) / David McKechnie (Meningie)
 1988  Des Hicks (Imperials)
 1987  Chris Smelt (Imperials) / David Ridgway (Ramblers)
 1986  Greg Zadow (Imperials)
 1985  Bradley Paech (Ramblers) / Dean Hansen (Border Downs)
 1984  Greg Zadow (Imperials)
 1983  Bradley Paech (Ramblers)
 1982  Bradley Paech (Ramblers)
 1981  Jimmy Rankine (Jervois)
 1980  Bradley Paech (Ramblers)
 1979  Garry Wright (Mypolonga)
 1978  Terry Williamson (Imperials) / Kevin Dinon (Mypolonga)
 1977  John Klienig (Mypolonga)
 1976  Terry Connolly (Tailem Bend)
 1975  Bohdan Cybulka (Ramblers)
 1974  Ron Liebelt (Ramblers)
 1973  Don Llewellyn (Jervois)
 1972  Bohdan Cybulka (Tailem Bend)
 1971  Bohdan Cybulka (Tailem Bend)
 1970  Bohdan Cybulka (Tailem Bend)
 1969  Bohdan Cybulka (Tailem Bend)
 1968  Bohdan Cybulka (Tailem Bend)
 1967  David Haythorpe (Mannum)
 1966  Evan Jenkins (Border Downs)
 1965  Bohdan Cybulka (Tailem Bend)
 1964  Geoff Lokan (Jervois)
 1963  Geoff Lokan (Jervois)
 1962  Geoff Lokan (Jervois)
 1961  Colin Gibbs (Jervois)
 1960  Wayne Sanders (Meningie)
 1959  Bill Lokan (Jervois)
 1958  Bill Lokan (Jervois) / Wayne Sanders (Meningie)
 1957  Laurie Reddaway (Border Downs)
 1956  Laurie Reddaway (Border Downs)
 1955  Eric Walter (Border Downs)
 1954  Colin Wakefield (Mannum)
 1953  Les Stone (Imperials)
 1952  Eric Smelt (Imperials) / Harry Enthoven (Tailem Bend)
 1951  Ron Hutchinson (Imperials) / Bill Martin (Mypolonga)
 1950  Bill Lipp (Imperials) / Alf Skuse (Tailem Bend)
 1949  Ron Hutchinson (Imperials)
 1941-1948 Not Awarded
 1940  Norm Weibricht (Imperials)
 1939  Bill Melville (Mypolonga)
 1938  Jack Foster (Mypolonga)

Bohdan Cybulka Medal 
Awarded to the best on ground during the League Grand Final.
 2022  Ben Gogel (Imperials)
 2021  Taite Silverlock (Jervois)
 2020  Luke Kluske (Jervois)
 2019  James Moss (MYpolonga)
 2018  John Boras (Imperials)
 2017  Clint Diment (Mypolonga)
 2016  Simon Newchurch (Ramblers)
 2015  Paul Adlington (Mannum)
 2014  Matthew Brunoli (Meningie)
 2013  Jake Bowen (Mannum)
 2012  Sam Margitich (Ramblers)
 2011  Tyson Wait (Imperials)
 2010  Joel Kay (Ramblers)
 2009  Zeb Kenny (Imperials)
 2008  Daniel Zadow (Ramblers)
 2007  Trevor Rigney (Jervois)
 2006  Tyron Hill (Jervois)
 2005  Ben Pyman (Jervois)
 2004  David Scholz (Jervois)
 2003  Justin Maloney (Mannum)
 2002  Simon Roesler (Imperials)
 2001  Scott Baggs (Meningie)
 2000  Craig Kowald (Tailem Bend)
 1999  Damian Garrett (Imperials)
 1998  Mark Hyam (Imperials)
 1997  Jeremy Stagg (Tailem Bend)
 1996  Mervyn Kartinyeri (Tailem Bend)
 1995  Malcolm Polhner (Tailem Bend)
 1994  John Bratkovic (Mypolonga)
 1993  Kelvin Farnham (Imperials)
 1992  Rick Laube (Tailem Bend)
 1991  John Bratkovic (Mypolonga)
 1990  Lee Adams (Mannum)

2010 Ladder

2011 Ladder

2012 Ladder

2013 Ladder

2014 Ladder

2015 Ladder

References

External links 
 Footypedia - RMFL
 country footy
 Imperial Football Club
 Rambler Football Club
 River Murray Football League

Books
 Encyclopedia of South Australian country football clubs / compiled by Peter Lines. 
 South Australian country football digest / by Peter Lines 

Australian rules football competitions in South Australia
Murray River